Horselords is a fantasy novel by David Cook, set in the world of the Forgotten Realms, and based on the Dungeons & Dragons role-playing game. It is the first novel in "The Empires Trilogy". It was published in paperback in May 1990.

Pitch
Koja, a priest of Furo, is sent by the prince Ogandi, leader of the Khazari to meet Yamun Khahan, the head of the newly unified Tuigan. The prince is concerned that the self styled Illustrious Emperor of all Nations has a desire for conquests; that the Khahan could push to invade his small country. 
Koja undertakes the journey to learn of the Tuigan ways, but once there, nothing is as he had imagined. Drama unfolds and the priest learns quickly that his fate will be linked to that of the Tuigan and their leader, resulting in an epic adventure full of action and twists.

Plot summary
Koja is presented Khahan while his army completes submit Semphar its authority. Impressed by his erudition and his diplomatic skills of the monk, it makes its regular columnist in charge to relate how a simple warrior Tuigan became the Illustrious Emperor of All Nations (because it is his ambition). Its role is rapidly gaining importance and is responsible for diplomacy Khahan and even became his anda (blood brother) after saving her life.

It is obviously not to the liking of general Tuigan to see a stranger so close to their leader, including General Chanar Ong Kho, also anda of Khahan and own mother Yamun, Bayalun Khadun, dedicated to his son visceral hatred. Thus, after further conquests Tuigan, such as taking the Khazari, Koja manages to uncover a plot against the Khahan. Officials Tuigan unmasked are severely punished but untouchable because sponsors are located in the mighty empire of Shou Lung.

It is not that deter the Khahan wash what he sees as a personal affront and after the first battle in which magical talents Koja used to open a breach in the Dragonwall, the invasion of Shou Lung can begin in earnest.

Main characters
 Koja
 Yamun Khahan
 Chanar Ong Kho
 Bayalun Khadun
 Prince Ogandi

Reception
One reviewer commented: "I recognize so many names from he book as being taken or inspired from history.  I gained my own interest in Ghengis Khan through another series and did some independent research.  So Horselords was a little boring for me because it seems like I've been through it already."

References

1990 American novels
Forgotten Realms novels